The 1983 Bordeaux Open also known as the Grand Prix Passing Shot was a men's tennis tournament played on outdoor clay courts at Villa Primrose in Bordeaux, France that was part of the 1983 Volvo Grand Prix. It was the fifth edition of the tournament and took place from 19 September until 23 September 1983. Fourth-seeded Pablo Arraya won the singles title.

Finals

Singles

 Pablo Arraya defeated  Juan Aguilera 7–5, 7–5
 It was Arraya's only singles title of his career.

Doubles

 Stefan Simonsson /  Magnus Tideman defeated  Francisco Yunis /  Juan Carlos Yunis 6–4, 6–2

References

External links
 ITF tournament edition details

Bordeaux Open
ATP Bordeaux
Bordeaux Open
Bordeaux Open